WRC Generations is a racing video game developed by Kylotonn and published by Nacon. It is the seventh entry in the World Rally Championship series by the French developer and holds the official license of the 2022 World Rally Championship. The game was released for Microsoft Windows, PlayStation 4, PlayStation 5, Xbox One and Xbox Series X/S on November 3, 2022 and Nintendo Switch on December 26, 2022.

It is the final WRC game to be released by Kylotonn, as Codemasters and EA Sports take over the rights from 2023 onwards.

Gameplay
As the new hybrid was implemented in the 2022 season, the game features brand-new car models based on the Ford Puma Rally1, Hyundai i20 N Rally1 and Toyota GR Yaris Rally1 respectively. Other than the three Group Rally1 cars, the game includes Group Rally2 cars and legendary cars, which would ensure vehicle number no fewer than thirty-seven. The Anniversary mode, which was first introduced in WRC 10, has also returned.

Development and release
WRC Generations was revealed on May 18, 2022, with both Kylotonn and Nacon return to work on the game. The game is set to be launched for Microsoft Windows, PlayStation 4, PlayStation 5, Xbox One and Xbox Series X/S platforms. The original release date was October 13, but two weeks before it was moved to November 3. A Nintendo Switch version has been announced for December 1, 2022 but released in North America in December 26, 2022.

References

External links
 

2022 video games
Esports games
Kylotonn games
Nacon games
Multiplayer and single-player video games
Multiplayer online games
PlayStation 4 games
PlayStation 5 games
Split-screen multiplayer games
Video games developed in France
Video games set in 2022
Video games set in Belgium
Video games set in Croatia
Video games set in Estonia
Video games set in Finland
Video games set in Greece
Video games set in Italy
Video games set in Japan
Video games set in Kenya
Video games set in Monaco
Video games set in New Zealand
Video games set in Portugal
Video games set in Sweden
Video games set in Spain
Windows games
World Rally Championship video games
Xbox One games
Xbox Series X and Series S games